The Erfurt Program was adopted by the Social Democratic Party of Germany during the SPD Congress at Erfurt in 1891. Formulated under the political guidance of Eduard Bernstein, August Bebel, and Karl Kautsky, it superseded the earlier Gotha Program.

The program
The program declared the imminent death of capitalism and the necessity of socialist ownership of the means of production. The Party intended to pursue these goals through legal political participation rather than by revolutionary activity. Kautsky argued that because capitalism, by its very nature, must collapse, the immediate task for socialists was to work for the improvement of workers' lives rather than for the revolution, which was inevitable.

Reception and response
The draft program was criticised by Friedrich Engels for its opportunist, non-Marxist views on the state in a criticism he sent to Kautsky on 29 June 1891.

Official commentary

Kautsky wrote the official SPD commentary on the program in 1892, which was called The Class Struggle. The Marxism exemplified by The Class Struggle was often referred to by later critics as "vulgar Marxism" or "the Marxism of the Second International." The popular renderings of Marxism found in the works of Kautsky and Bebel were read and distributed more widely in Europe between the late 19th century and 1914 than Marx's own works. The Class Struggle was translated into 16 languages before 1914 and became the accepted popular summation of Marxist theory. This document came to be defined against 'orthodox' socialist theory before the October Revolution of 1917 caused a major split in the international socialist movement.

See also 
 Maximum program
 Minimum program
 Transitional program
 Frankfurt declaration

References 

 Kautsky, Karl Das Erfurter Programm Dietz Nachf. Verlag, Stuttgart, 1920
 Sassoon, Donald One Hundred Years of Socialism. The New Press, New York, 1996.

External links
The Erfurt Program
A Critique of the Erfurt Program by Friedrich Engels
The Class Struggle by Karl Kautsky

1891 in politics
Marxism
Party platforms
Social Democratic Party of Germany
Program
1891 documents